A referendum on building a coal-fired power plant was held in Slovenia on 10 January 1999. Voters were asked whether they approved of the construction of the TET3 coal-fired power plant. The proposal was rejected by 79.8% of voters, although voter turnout was just 27.3%.

Results

References

Slovenia
Referendums in Slovenia
Coal power station referendum
Slovenia
Slovenia